Gravity (stylized with brackets and two interpuncts as [grav·i·ty]) is an American comedy-drama television series created by Jill Franklyn and Eric Schaeffer. It ran for one season in 2010 on Starz.

Premise
The series "follows the sometimes comic, sometimes tragic exploits of a group from an eccentric out-patient program of suicide survivors". Production of the show began in New York City in October 2009.

Creation
Franklyn created the show during the 2007–2008 Writers Guild of America strike. She is known for her Emmy-nominated "Yada Yada" episode of Seinfeld.  In 2008 she brought in Eric Schaeffer and they collaborated in selling the show to the Starz Network.  The show's working titles were Suicide for Dummies and Failure to Fly.

Cast
 Ivan Sergei as Robert Collingsworth; a middle aged eye doctor labeled the "suicide dummy" after driving off a peak in an attempt to kill himself so that he could be with his dead wife, he landed on a cruise ship. He has a relationship with Lily Champagne and develops a conflicted friendship with Christian; he also has an ugly relationship with his estranged mother. 
 Krysten Ritter as Lily Champagne; a shy, lonely 27-year-old woman who works at a department store who attempts to kill herself by eating a poisonous slice of chocolate cake and claims to have made love with someone in heaven but turns out to have made it up to hide her true reasons for killing herself. She also enjoys sketching and when someone asks her why she says "I sell makeup at a department store, I change lives" .
 Eric Schaeffer as Detective Christian Miller; a man who claims to be a police officer but is in a debt crisis after placing so many losing bets, he seems to stalk Lily after her suicide attempt and tries to look for information about his dead mother. His many flaws seem to have him butt heads with a man named Diego.
 Rachel Hunter as Shawna Rollins; a model who attempts to kill herself by slitting her wrists and develops a relationship with Adam
 Robyn Cohen as Carla; a housewife who attempts to kill herself by shooting herself after being tired of a routine life and living up to everyone's expectations.
 James Martinez as Jorge Sanchez; a former construction worker who attempts to kill himself by placing himself in a collapsing building, he is so insecure about his penis size that he gets a penis implant. He also works as a comedian.
 Seth Numrich as Adam Rosenblum; a teenager who attempts to kill himself by overdosing after his rocky relationship with his family makes him depressed. He also develops a relationship with Shawna.
 Ving Rhames as Dogg McFee; the group leader and former New York Mets player who attempted suicide after hearing all the criticism of losing the NLCS after a car accident left him confined to a wheelchair. He also has a difficult relationship with his son who chose the wrong path due to his father neglecting him.

Episodes

References

 General references

External links
 

2010 American television series debuts
2010 American television series endings
2010s American comedy-drama television series
English-language television shows
Starz original programming
Television shows set in New York City